A Shade of My Former Self is the debut studio album by Dutch band The Charm The Fury. It was released on September 16, 2013 through Listenable Records.

Track listing

Personnel

The Charm The Fury
Caroline Westendorp – vocals
Mathijs Tieken – drums
Rolf Perdok – guitars
Lucas Arnoldussen – bass
Mathijs Parent – guitars

Guest musicians
Jamie Graham – additional vocals (track 5)
Daniel de Jongh – additional vocals (track 6)

Production
Mathijs Tieken – producer, engineering, mixing
Will Putney – mastering
Stefan Karlsson – drum engineering, drum production
Jon Barmby – art direction, design

References

2013 debut albums
The Charm The Fury albums
Listenable Records albums